The George Dunbar House is a historic house in Nogales, Arizona. It was built in 1918 for George W. Dunbar, a real estate developer who built 75 houses in Nogales, Arizona and a dozen more in Nogales, Sonora across the Mexico–United States border. The house was designed in the American Craftsman architectural style. It has been listed on the National Register of Historic Places since August 29, 1985.

References

 
National Register of Historic Places in Santa Cruz County, Arizona
Houses completed in 1918
1918 establishments in Arizona